Walter Waldhör (born September 21, 1968) is a former Austria international footballer, currently manager of Union Pettenbach.

References

1968 births
Living people
Austrian footballers
Austria international footballers
SK Vorwärts Steyr players
LASK players
SV Ried players
Association football forwards